Liliya Afanasyevna Vasilchenko (8 June 1962 in Novosibirsk – 19 December 2011) was a former Soviet cross-country skier who competed from 1982 to 1986, training at Trudovye Rezervy in Novosibirsk. She won a gold medal in the 4 × 5 km relay at the 1985 FIS Nordic World Ski Championships in Seefeld and finished eight in the 20 km at those same championships.

Vasilchenko's best individual finish at the Winter Olympics was 17th in the 5 km event in Sarajevo, in 1984.

Cross-country skiing results
All results are sourced from the International Ski Federation (FIS).

Olympic Games

World Championships
 1 medal – (1 gold)

World Cup

Season standings

Individual podiums

1 podium

Team podiums

 1 victory 
 1 podium 

Note:   Until the 1999 World Championships, World Championship races were included in the World Cup scoring system.

References

External links

1962 births
2011 deaths
Soviet female cross-country skiers
Cross-country skiers at the 1984 Winter Olympics
Sportspeople from Novosibirsk
FIS Nordic World Ski Championships medalists in cross-country skiing
Russian female cross-country skiers